The Islamic Azad University, Ahvaz Branch (IAUA) (Persian: دانشگاه آزاد اسلامی واحد اهواز), also known as the Islamic Azad University of Ahvaz, is a private university in Ahvaz, Khuzestan, Iran. This university is a branch of the Islamic Azad University. It was established in 1982, and offers Bachelor, Masters and PhD degrees.

Academics  

 Faculties/colleges 

 Faculty of Engineering
 Faculty of Agriculture and Natural Resources
 Faculty of Humanities Sciences
 Faculty of Nursing and Midwifery
 Faculty of Sciences

References

External links
  
  
 Virtual Tour of Islamic Azad University, Ahvaz Branch (360° Photos)

Ahvaz
Education in Khuzestan Province
Buildings and structures in Khuzestan Province
1982 establishments in Iran
Educational institutions established in 1982
Ahvaz